Khanadal is a village in Belgaum district in Karnataka, India.

References
lohit hunchale 

Villages in Belagavi district

 ಶ್ರೀ ಹುಲಕಾಂತೆಶ್ವೇರ್ ದೇವರು